Han Dong (born 2 March 2001) is a Chinese footballer currently playing as a forward for Henan Jianye.

Club career
Han Dong was promoted to the senior team of Henan Jianye within the 2019 Chinese Super League season and would make his debut in a Chinese FA Cup game on 1 May 2019 against Guangzhou Evergrande in a 2-0 defeat where he came on as a substitute for Wang Yifan.

Career statistics
.

References

External links

2001 births
Living people
Chinese footballers
China youth international footballers
Association football forwards
Chinese Super League players
Henan Songshan Longmen F.C. players
21st-century Chinese people